Ernest Renshaw and William Renshaw defeated Ernest Meers and A. G. Ziffo 6–3, 6–2, 6–2 in the All Comers' Final, and then the reigning champions Patrick Bowes-Lyon and Herbert Wilberforce 2–6, 1–6, 6–3, 6–4, 6–3 in the challenge round to win the gentlemen's doubles tennis title at the 1888 Wimbledon Championships.

Draw

Challenge round

All Comers'

References

External links

Gentlemen's Doubles
Wimbledon Championship by year – Men's doubles